A1-CM Furia — is Ukrainian unmanned aerial vehicle (UAV) designed for aerial reconnaissance. It made its first flight in 2014 and was commissioned by the Armed Forces of Ukraine in 2020. A1-CM Furia UAVs have been used in the 2022 Russian invasion of Ukraine.

References 

Unmanned aerial vehicles of Ukraine
Reconnaissance aircraft
Military equipment of the 2022 Russian invasion of Ukraine